Below is the list of airports in Karnataka.

Map

References  

Airports
Karnataka